Camp Beaver Dam was an American World War II prisoner of war camp in Beaver Dam, Wisconsin during the summer of 1944. The camp held 300 German prisoners of war in a tent city encampment where the Wayland Academy field house now stands.

See also
List of POW camps in the United States

References

Further reading
Cowley, Betty. Stalag Wisconsin: Inside WW II Prisoner of War Camps. 2002. 
Billinger, Robert D. Hitler's Soldiers in the Sunshine State: German Pows in Florida. 2000.
Fiedler, David Winston. The Enemy Among Us: POWs in Missouri During World War II. 2003
Gaertner, Georg. Hitler's Last Soldier in America. 1985.
Kiefer, Louis E. Italian Prisoners of War in America, 1942–1946: Captives or Allies? 1992.
Koop, Allen V. Stark Decency: German Prisoners of War in a New England Village. 1988.
Krammer, Arnold. Nazi Prisoners of War in America. 1996.
Lewis, George C. and John Mewha. History of Prisoner of War Utilization by the United States Army, 1776–1945. 1955.
Moore, John Hammond. The Faustball Tunnel: German POWs in America and Their Great Escape. 1978.
Waters, Michael R. Lone Star Stalag: German Prisoners of War at Camp Hearne. 2004.

World War II prisoner of war camps in the United States
History of Wisconsin
Military installations in Wisconsin
Buildings and structures in Dodge County, Wisconsin
Beaver Dam, Wisconsin
1944 in Wisconsin